"Spotlight" is an R&B song by Jennifer Hudson, written and produced by Ne-Yo and Norwegian production duo Stargate for Hudson's self-titled debut album. It was released digitally on June 10, 2008, as the album's first single and reached the top 30 of the US Billboard Hot 100. Outside the US, the track reached the top 20 in Hungary, Japan, and the United Kingdom.

The song received two Grammy Award nominations at the 2009 ceremony for Best R&B Song and Best Female R&B Vocal Performance. The video was voted 12th on BET: Notarized Top 100 videos of 2008.

Critical reception
The song received generally positive reviews. About.com said that "If you were one of the people wondering if Jennifer Hudson could sustain her vocal energy, power and passion on a full album like she did in the role of Effie in the movie Dreamgirls and like she also does on the album's opening song and first single, "Spotlight," then wonder no more: the answer's a definite yes. "Spotlight" exemplifies the album as a whole: it's got a strong, independent woman singing strongly about love and relationships. In this case, the song is about a controlling lover: "If I'm just love's prisoner, then I'm bustin' out," she sings." AllHipHop said that ""Spotlight" as catchy as it is was not debut single-worthy, and a brand new artist wouldn't have been looked at twice; but because it was Jennifer (and penned by Ne-Yo) attention was paid.". AllMusic said that " 'Spotlight' was both promising and satisfying, nearly a dead-center bull's-eye – dramatic but not over the top, powerful but not a gratuitous fireworks display, a melancholy but striking midtempo track with a gently thumping four-four pulse." Digital Spy said that Hudson "navigates the emotional complexities of 'Spotlight', on which she plays a downtrodden girlfriend". New York Daily News said that the song's "trendy, staccato backup vocals give the song spine. Better, the character presented by the lyrics – a put-upon woman who's finally stepping out – fits Hudson's persona as the angry queen of payback." Slant magazine said that "Lead single "Spotlight" is a serviceable, pulsating, you-did-me-wrong jam that is, thanks to Stargate and Ne-Yo, perfectly in line with today's trends." The Times said the song "is predictably mid-tempo as it tries to please all her fan bases at once."

Music video
The song's music video was directed by Chris Robinson and Hudson introduced its premiere screening on BET's 106 and Park on June 24, 2008. Ryan Gentles from the plays Madea Goes to Jail and Diary of a Mad Black Woman appears in the video as Hudson's love interest.

Hudson appears talking on her cellphone to her friend, complaining about her over-protective boyfriend. After she gets off her cellphone, she puts on a jacket and a scarf and leave her house into an alley, then entering a nightclub, dancing and having a good time until she sees her boyfriend Gentles. She then takes his hand and leads him into a white room with stripes telling him that she loves him but that he needs to realize that she is a good girlfriend and not to worry before it is too late. Towards the end of the video, Hudson is walking down a runway with her boyfriend sitting in front of the runway. The video ends with Hudson getting off her cellphone. A bottle of Campari is prominently displayed in the video in a scene featuring Hudson and Gentles at the nightclub.

Chart performance
"Spotlight" peaked at number twenty-four on the Billboard Hot 100, giving Hudson her first top thirty hit to date on the chart. The song also peaked at number one on the Billboard Hot R&B/Hip-Hop Songs, spending two consecutive weeks at number one.

On September 21, 2008, the song entered the UK Singles Chart at number fifteen on downloads alone. It is her first top twenty hit in the United Kingdom, and climbed to number eleven on September 28 despite there being no CD single release. It also peaked at number one on UK Airplay Chart. All in all the song performed better on the charts in the United Kingdom than in her native United States. In 2008, "Spotlight" was the biggest selling non-top ten single of the year. In 2017, following an impromptu performance on The Voice UK the song re-entered the United Kingdom charts at number 90.

Track listings

US CD single
 "Spotlight" (album version) – 4:10
 "Spotlight" (instrumental) – 4:11
 "Spotlight" (call out hook) – 0:11
 "Spotlight" (Remix By Jemell Moore [Google My Name]) – 4:09

German basic CD
 "Spotlight" (album version) – 4:10
 "Spotlight" (part 2; featuring Young Jeezy) – 5:07

German premium CD
 "Spotlight" (main version) – 4:10
 "Spotlight" (Moto Blanco club mix) – 7:56
 "Spotlight" (Quentin Harris Dark Collage club mix) – 11:31
 "Spotlight" (Johnny Vicious Muzik mix) – 9:30
 "Spotlight" (music video) – 3:39

UK digital single
 "Spotlight" (U.K. radio edit) – 3:44

UK download bundle
 "Spotlight" – 4:10
 "Spotlight" (Moto Blanco club mix) – 7:56
 "Spotlight" (Quentin Harris Dark College club mix) – 8:49
 "Spotlight" (Johnny Vicious Muzik mix) – 6:45
 "Spotlight" (Moto Blanco dub) – 6:58
 "Spotlight" (Johnny vicious Warehouse dub) – 7:11
 "Spotlight" (Moto Blanco radio mix) – 4:11
 "Spotlight" (Johnny Vicious radio mix) – 3:52

Charts

Weekly charts

Year-end charts

Certifications

Release history

Cover versions
 The song was covered on the season 3 episode "Asian F" of Glee by Mercedes Jones (Amber Riley).

See also
 List of number-one R&B singles of 2008 (U.S.)

References

External links
 JenniferHudsonOnline.com – official site

2008 singles
Jennifer Hudson songs
Music videos directed by Chris Robinson (director)
Song recordings produced by Stargate (record producers)
Songs written by Tor Erik Hermansen
Songs written by Mikkel Storleer Eriksen
Songs written by Ne-Yo
2008 songs
Arista Records singles
J Records singles